Lin Chun-yi may refer to:
 Lin Chun-yi (badminton) (born 1999), Taiwanese badminton player
 Lin Chun-yi (volleyball) (born 1983), Taiwanese volleyball player
 Edgar Lin (born 1938), Taiwanese biologist, diplomat, and politician